Ride Along is a 2014 American buddy cop action comedy film directed by Tim Story and starring Ice Cube, and Kevin Hart.

The film follows Ben Barber (Kevin Hart), a security guard who must prove to his girlfriend's police officer brother, James Payton (Ice Cube), that he is worthy of marrying her. During their 24-hour patrol of Atlanta, Ben accidentally gets wrapped up in James' hunt for an arms dealer, Omar (Laurence Fishburne).

The film was produced by Relativity Media, Cube Vision Productions and Universal Pictures, and distributed by Universal Pictures. Following two premieres in Atlanta and Los Angeles, the film was released worldwide on January 17, 2014. A sequel, Ride Along 2, was released on January 15, 2016.

Plot
Undercover detective James Payton is on a falsifying passports operation run by "Omar". After a shootout with the smugglers, his lieutenant asks him to drop the case, which he does not.

Ben Barber, a jumpy, short high school security guard who plays video games in his spare time, applies to the Atlanta City Police Academy. He asks James for his blessing to marry his sister, Angela. James tells Ben has to go on a "ride along" first to prove he is worthy of her. If successful, he will recommend him for the academy, and give his blessing.

Taking Ben to the station, James asks dispatch to give him all the 1-26s that are called in, which he has Ben take care of. Questioning the informant Runflat, James uncovers the connection between Serbia and "Omar" and hears a shipment will come in later that day. Leaving the park, James takes Ben to the local shooting range and finds out that Zastava M92's have been given to the store. When a 1-26 is called in, Ben and James go to the Sweet Auburn Curb Market, where drunken 'Crazy Cody' is being disorderly. Ben tries to subdue him but cannot, so James arrests him.

Ben asks to be taken home before Angela's call. He tells her about his stressful day, and she tells him James plays poker with a guy named Crazy Cody, and that 1-26s are code for annoying situations for newbies as a joke. He then goes into the police station and sees Cody laughing with James, Santiago and Miggs.

Upset, Ben refuses to go home and instead takes a 1-26 for a disturbance at a strip club. There, two men get into a Mexican standoff with James and Ben which Ben, believing is another joke call, fools around. James subdues them, then they are tipped off about a gun deal with Omar's men. Ben confronts James about the 1-26s.

James receives a call from Santiago in the car, finding out that Runflat had turned himself in. Ben says Runflat's brother told him in the park Runflat had just got out of prison, news to James so, another clue. They talk to Runflat's other brother, J, to get the location of the gun deal. During the conversation, Ben accidentally shoots J, who reveals where and when the deal will take place.

Deciding to infiltrate the warehouse with Santiago and Miggs, James leaves Ben in the car. They betray him, turning out to be crooked cops working for Omar. James is then tied up, which Ben sees. Santiago mocks and criticizes James for being unsociable and egocentric. As the deal begins, Ben pretends to be Omar (as no one has ever seen the real Omar). 

Successfully fooling them, Ben wreaks havoc at the deal. Just as he is about to leave with James, the real Omar appears. A shootout ensues, and many of Omar's men are killed. Ben shows his sharp reflexes and knowledge of battle (thanks to his gaming). James and Ben take the money from the deal and escape before the warehouse explodes as Ben's grenade hits a box of explosives and destroys James's car. Unbeknownst to them, Santiago, Miggs and Omar escape.

Santiago and Miggs arrive at Angela's apartment, tying her up. As she was playing one of Ben's interactive games, Ben's fellow gamers hear the confrontation between Angela, Miggs and Santiago through Ben's headset. At the hospital, being treated for a gunshot wound in the leg, Ben receives a call from a fellow gamer, who tells James something's going on at the apartment. After seeing some cops arriving at the hospital, James and Ben sneak out to the apartment with Omar's money. 

James injures Miggs, before fighting with Santiago. As Santiago is about to shoot him, Angela knocks him out. Ben gets knocked out by Omar in a fight, who then takes the bag of money and Angela, and leaves.

James follows Omar and Angela, confronting him. Just as Omar is about to shoot James, Ben slides over a car and kicks him. James shoots Omar twice, injuring him. Police arrest Omar, Miggs, and Santiago, and James finally gives Ben his blessing.

In a mid-credits scene, Ben and Angela are engaged, and Ben is weeks away from graduating from the police academy. At a barbecue at James', Ben blows up the barbecue and goes flying into the bushes, killing the neighbor's dog.

Cast

 Ice Cube as James Payton, undercover police detective
 Kevin Hart as Ben Barber, James' sister's boyfriend
 Tika Sumpter as Angela Payton, James's sister and Ben's girlfriend
 John Leguizamo as Santiago, a detective and Miggs' partner
 Bryan Callen as Miggs, a detective and Santiago's partner
 Laurence Fishburne as Omar, a boss of smugglers
 Bruce McGill as Lieutenant Brooks, head of the Atlanta Police department

Additional cast includes Gary Owen as Crazy Cody, Jay Pharoah as Runflat, David Banner as Pawnshop Jay, Dragoș Bucur as Marko, Gary Weeks as Dr. Cowan, Jacob Latimore as Ramone and Benjamin Flores, Jr. as Morris, Runflat's brother.

Production
On November 29, 2009, The Hollywood Reporter announced that comedian Jason Mantzoukas had been hired to write cop-buddy comedy film Ride Along for New Line Cinema, originally written by Greg Coolidge, with Ice Cube set to star in and produce the film along with Matt Alvarez, through Cube's film company, Cube Vision Productions. The film was originally offered to Warner Bros., but according to Cube, the Warner executives reportedly passed down the offer because they told him that an action movie with two Black stars wouldn't sell well overseas; a studio executive claimed that the concerns about the stars were false and that the true reason for passing on Ride Along was because of script disagreements. On July 11, 2012, Universal Pictures acquired the distribution rights to the film from New Line, with production starting in October, Tim Story was set to direct the film, rewritten by Matt Manfredi and Phil Hay, and produced by Will Packer and Larry Brezner. On October 31, the studio announced the film would be released on January 17, 2014.

Casting
Ice Cube joined the cast on November 29, 2009, to play the lead role, Detective James; the story was then about a rogue cop who tries to break off his sister's engagement to an upper-crust white psychiatrist by inviting his future brother-in-law on a ride-along. Kevin Hart joined the cast on July 11, 2012 to play Ben, a high school security guard, with his character changed from white to black. On October 16, John Leguizamo joined the cast of the film to play an undercover cop. On October 30, Tika Sumpter, Bryan Callen, and Jay Pharoah joined the cast; Sumpter plays Angela, Ben's fiancée and James' sister, while Callen plays an undercover cop, and Pharoah plays a street informant.

On November 9, Backstage posted that the film's director was looking for adult extras of all ethnicities for the background in the film. On November 16, Bruce McGill joined the cast of the film to play a hard-nosed lieutenant. On December 7, Gary Owen also joined the cast, followed by Laurence Fishburne.

Filming
Principal photography on the film began on October 31, 2012 in Atlanta, and crews were filming some scenes at Underground Atlanta on October 31 and November 1. On October 31, CBS Atlanta posted the news that Atlanta police are warning residents that there would be a simulated gun battle inside the mall area during the filming on Thursday, November 1. It was a 35-day shoot, which wrapped up filming on December 19 in Atlanta.

Music
On April 29, 2013, Christopher Lennertz was hired to score the film. Lennertz previously collaborated with Story on the 2012 comedy Think Like A Man. The soundtrack was released digitally on January 14, 2014 by Back Lot Music, while a CD version was released on January 28 by Varèse Sarabande.

Promotion and release

A teaser trailer and an image were released on July 1, 2013. On September 26, studio revealed the first teaser poster featuring Cube and Hart. On November 5, eight new images from the set and the poster were revealed. A second trailer of the film was revealed from studio on November 7. On December 19, Universal released a full length trailer for the film.

On the night of January 6, 2014, the film's first premiere was held at Atlantic Station in Atlanta. On January 13, the Los Angeles premiere was held at TCL Chinese Theatre in Hollywood, California. Following the two premieres, the film was released worldwide on January 17, 2014.

Box office
The film's 3-day opening weekend gross was $41,516,170, at 2,663 US and Canadian theaters (an average of $15,590 per theater gross), giving Ride Along the then-record for highest domestic opening weekend gross in the month of January, ahead of 2008's Cloverfield. For the 4-day record-breaking MLK weekend, the film grossed $48,626,380. The film held the number one spot at the US box office for three weeks, grossing $21 million and $12 million in its second and third weekends. The North American domestic gross was $134,202,565, with the international gross being $19,059,619, bringing the worldwide total to $153,262,184.

Home media
Ride Along was released on DVD and Blu-ray on April 15, 2014. This release included an alternate ending, a gag reel, deleted scenes, a behind-the-scenes documentary and a feature commentary of the film by Story. In the United States, the film has grossed $13.5 million from DVD sales and $8.7 million from Blu-ray sales, making a total of $22.2 million.

Reception

Critical response
Ride Along received generally negative reviews from critics. On Rotten Tomatoes the film has an approval rating of 18%, based on 136 reviews, with an average rating of 4.20/10. The site's consensus states: "Kevin Hart's livewire presence gives Ride Along a shot of necessary energy, but it isn't enough to rescue this would-be comedy from the buddy-cop doldrums." Metacritic assigns the film a score of 41 out of 100, based on 34 critics, indicating "mixed or average reviews". Audiences surveyed by CinemaScore gave the film a grade of "A" on an A+ to F scale.

British critic Mark Kermode gave the film one out of five stars, describing it as "an action-comedy short on both action and comedy."

Scott Foundas of Variety called the film "a lazy and listless buddy-cop action-comedy that fades from memory as quickly as its generic title." Entertainment Weekly′s film critic Chris Nashawaty gave the film a "C+" grade."

Accolades

The film received several award nominations, a 2014 BET Award for Best Actor for Kevin Hart, and two 2014 MTV Movie Awards nominations, Best On-Screen Duo for Ice Cube and Hart, and Best Comedic Performance for Hart. On April 13, 2014, after the best-screen-duo award went to Vin Diesel and Paul Walker for Fast & Furious 6, Ice Cube joked to USA Today that they were robbed.

Sequel

On April 23, 2013, the studio announced that there would be a sequel to the film. On February 18, 2014, it was announced that after the success of the first Ride Along film, Universal was moving forward with the sequel, which Tim Story would return to direct. Ice Cube and Kevin Hart reprised their roles, with Will Packer producing, and Phil Hay and Matt Manfredi on board again as screenwriters. Ride Along 2 started filming on July 7, 2014; filming locations included Miami, Florida and Atlanta, Georgia. Universal released the film on January 15, 2016.

References

External links
 
 
 

2014 films
2014 action comedy films
2010s buddy comedy films
American action comedy films
American buddy cop films
Films directed by Tim Story
Films produced by Ice Cube
Films produced by Will Packer
Films set in Atlanta
Films shot in Atlanta
2010s police comedy films
Rainforest Films films
Relativity Media films
Universal Pictures films
Cube Vision films
Films scored by Christopher Lennertz
African-American comedy films
2010s buddy cop films
Films about the Serbian Mafia
Films with screenplays by Phil Hay (screenwriter)
Films with screenplays by Matt Manfredi
Fictional portrayals of the Atlanta Police Department
2010s English-language films
2010s American films
American buddy comedy films
African-American films